No Shame, No Fear is a 2003 novel for young adults by Ann Turnbull. Set in the fictional town of Hemsbury in the 1660s, the novel depicts the love between a Quaker girl, Susanna, and Will, the son of a rich merchant. Their story takes place during the persecution of religious dissenters after the restoration of the monarchy.

In 2006, a sequel, Forged in the Fire, was published.

In March 2007, a stage adaptation of No Shame, No Fear  by Charlie Gardner and Lisa Whelan was produced at the Jermyn Street Theatre in London and reviewed for The Stage newspaper.

References

2003 British novels
British historical novels
British young adult novels
Novels set in Shropshire
Novels set in Early Modern England
Novels set in the 1660s
Walker Books books